Hamza Bouras (born 16 December 1987 in Rouïba) is an Algerian sailor. He placed 36th in the men's RS:X event at the 2016 Summer Olympics.

He competed at the 2020 Summer Olympics in the men's RS:X event where he placed 25th.

References

External links
 
 
 

1987 births
Living people
Algerian windsurfers
Algerian male sailors (sport)
Olympic sailors of Algeria
Sailors at the 2016 Summer Olympics – RS:X
Sailors at the 2020 Summer Olympics – RS:X
Mediterranean Games competitors for Algeria
Competitors at the 2018 Mediterranean Games
Sportspeople from Algiers
21st-century Algerian people
20th-century Algerian people